Luís Pedro may refer to:
Luís Pedro (footballer, born 1989), Portuguese footballer
Luís Pedro (footballer, born 1990), Dutch footballer
Luis Pedro (footballer, born 1992), Angolan footballer